Tõnu-Reid Kukk (3 April 1939 – 15 September 2011) was an Estonian politician. He was born in Tallinn. Reid-Kukk was a member of VII and VIII Riigikogu.

References

1939 births
2011 deaths
Members of the Riigikogu, 1992–1995
Members of the Riigikogu, 1995–1999
Estonian Coalition Party politicians
Politicians from Tallinn
Burials at Metsakalmistu